Pouya Pourali (born 22 March 1996 in Bahnemir, Mazandaran province) is an Iranian professional football player who plays as a defensive midfielder for Persian Gulf Pro League club Zob Ahan. He also has a history of playing for Khoneh Be Khoneh, Baadraan and Fajr Sepasi.

He played his first game in the Pro League in the first week of the Iranian Football Pro League 2021-22 against Sanat Naft Abadan in the starting lineup.

In addition to the position of defensive midfielder, this player also has the ability to play in the positions of central midfielder, winger, right back and central defender.

Club career

Early career

Pouya Pourali started his football career with the youth of Padideh Sari Club and with this team became the champion of the National Youth Regions League in 2011. He later joined to the Shahrdari Juybar Club and with this team in 2012 became the champion of Mazandaran Province Youth.

Baadran

Pourali joined the Khoneh Be Khoneh Babol team in 2015, and after spending two seasons, he left the club and join to Baadran. In Baadraan, he played only one game and the next season he went to the Khoneh Be Khoneh club again.

Khoneh Be Khoneh F.C. 
Pourali joined Khoneh Be Khoneh in 2018. During one year at the club, he managed to play 19 games (1,696 minutes).

Fajr Sepasi Shiraz F.C. 
In 2019, Pourali joined Fajr Sepasi Shiraz to perform his military service and managed to score 1 goal in 22 games (1,980 minutes) for this team in the Azadegan League. And in the 2020-21 season, won the Azadegan League with this team and succeeded in advancing to the Pro League.

Zob Ahan Esfahan F.C. 
In 2021, Pouya Pourali joined the Zob Ahan Football Club team under the direct supervision of the head coach, Mehdi Tartar, and played 10 games in the Hazfi Cup and Pro League for this team until the middle of the season.

Honours

Padideh Sari
Youth Regions League: 2011

Shahrdari Juybar
Mazandaran Province Youth League: 2012

Khoneh Be Khoneh
First Division Youth League: 2014
Youth Azadegan League: 2015-16
Youth Pro League: 2016–17

Fajr Sepasi 
Azadegan League: 2020–21

References

External links 

 

Iranian footballers
Living people
Persian Gulf Pro League players
Zob Ahan Esfahan F.C. players
Association football midfielders
1996 births
Sportspeople from Mazandaran province
Association football defenders